The Essex Railroad (later known as the Lawrence Branch of the Eastern Railroad) was a  independent railroad in Essex County, Massachusetts in the US that connected Salem to North Andover.

The railroad received its charter in 1846, with some backing from the Eastern Railroad, and by the beginning of 1847, the first  of track were completed from Salem to Peabody (then called South Danvers). The route was operated by the Eastern while the track to North Andover was constructed. In 1850, two new lines, the South Reading Branch Railroad and the Salem and Lowell Railroad, rented this stretch to give the Essex badly-needed revenue.

By September 1848, the Essex was completed to the Boston and Maine Railroad's main line in North Andover, and it was given trackage rights to Lawrence and South Lawrence over the B&M.

From the beginning, the Essex operation was under-capitalized, and it was soon in financial trouble. Operations were suspended three times. The first shut down was in April 1849, and the line remained closed for a year. The line reopened in the spring of 1850, but financial problems halted operations again by the fall. In October 1851, the Essex entered into a lease agreement with the Eastern, and the line was reopened and run as the Eastern's Lawrence Branch.

When the Eastern was absorbed by the B&M in 1884, Essex County was a dense network of rail lines through sparsely populated areas. The B&M could not justify keeping all these branch lines open. Freight service on the Essex had all but disappeared by 1925, and passenger service had lost riders to the trolley lines running through Danvers and Middleton. The only services on the line that were still strong were the passenger service for Lawrence factory workers commuting to North Andover and the freight service between Salem and Danvers Junction, where the Essex met the Newburyport Branch.

In 1927, the B&M abandoned the line between Stevens Station in North Andover and Danvers Junction. The line continued to operate until Stevens Mills closed in the 1960s and freight service to the North Andover Machine Shop ended in 1981. The line was formally abandoned later that year. Commuter service between Danvers Jct and Salem picked up and remained strong until 1958, when passenger service stopped.  In 1985, the Waters River Bridge caught fire and took the line out of service.  Customers north of the bridge were serviced via the Newburyport branch until all service on that line was suspended around 2000.  The line between Peabody Square and Salem remains open for freight today and the MBTA has preliminary plans to reopen passenger service between Salem and Danvers Jct, replacing the old bridge to gain access to Danvers.

Portions in Danvers and Middleton have been converted to rail trails. A connecting segment at Route 1 is planned to open in 2024.

References

 
 

Defunct Massachusetts railroads
Railway companies established in 1848
Railway companies disestablished in 1884
Predecessors of the Boston and Maine Railroad